TAG24 is a German regional news website that operates editorial offices and local channels in 10 cities. Its publisher is TAG24 News Deutschland GmbH, based in Dresden. Like the Morgenpost of Saxony, from which it emerged, it belongs to the tabloid press. Tag24 is one of the top 20 news websites in Germany by unique monthly visitors.

Concept and Content 
TAG24 does not have a traditional main page. Instead, users can select a local channel featuring news from 10 German regions or cities. Alternatively, they can opt for an overarching national channel which highlights story from around the country and the world. All channels mix both regional and national content. The site is a single-page application, loading new content as the user scrolls down.

As of 2021, TAG24 has 10 editorial teams in addition to the Germany editorial team: Berlin, Chemnitz, Dresden, Frankfurt am Main., Hamburg, Cologne, Leipzig, Munich, Stuttgart, and Thuringia.

History 
TAG24 launched on October 3, 2014, under the name Mopo24. It was intended to be the website of the Morgenpost Sachsen (Morgenpost Dresden and Morgenpost Chemnitz) regional newspaper. However, after tensions with the Hamburger Morgenpost, an unaffiliated publication which already had an online presence under mopo.de, the name was changed to TAG24.de in order to avoid confusion. After the name change in October 2016, the website's reach developed beyond Saxony and new editorial offices were opened across Germany. In Germany, Google News Showcase has signed partnerships with Tag24 and Sächsische Zeitung.

Shareholder structure 
TAG24 News Deutschland GmbH is part of the Dresden-based DDV Media Group, which also publishes the Sächsische Zeitung and Morgenpost Sachsen newspapers, among others. The Gruner+Jahr publishing house has a 60% stake in the media group, while the remaining 40% is held by the Deutsche Druck- und Verlagsgesellschaft, the media holding company of the Social Democratic Party of Germany (SPD).

References 

German-language mass media
Publications established in 2014
Websites
German-language newspapers